Hermann J. Huber (31 October 1954 – 28 July 2009) was a German journalist and writer. He was born in Moosbach.

Life 
After school in Weiden in der Oberpfalz, Bavaria, at Augustinus-Gymnasium Weiden Huber studied Roman Catholic theology and history in Munich at Ludwig Maximilian University of Munich. After university studies Huber worked as a journalist. From 1977 to 1981 Huber was president of the Medien und Jugend in Deutschland organisation. Huber was editor-in-chief of the magazines die alternative and Der Blickpunkt. During the 1980s and 1990s Huber wrote 14 books. In 1989, his book Leben, Lieben, Legenden became of national interest in Germany. In this book Huber wrote about popular gay people such as singer Rex Gildo.

Huber, who lived openly gay, died of a myocardial infarction on 28 July 2009 in Moosbach.

Works by Huber 
 Leben, Lieben, Legenden (1989)
 Leben, Laster, Leidenschaft, Weitere 60 schillernde Kultstars der Schwulen (Foerster Verlag, Frankfurt/Main)
 Gay Video Guide – Part 1 (Foerster Media, Offenbach)
 Gay Video Guide – Part 2 (Foerster Media, Offenbach)
 Das schwule Dschungelbuch (Foerster Media, Offenbach)
 Schauspieler Lexikon der Gegenwart – Germany Austria Switzerland (Langen Müller Verlag, Munich)
 Gewalt und Leidenschaft – Filmlexikon (Bruno Gmünder Verlag, Berlin)
 Gott spielt mit – Film- und Fernsehstars über ihren Glauben (Herder Verlag, Freiburg)

References

External links 
 
 hjh-press: Obituary of Hermann J. Huber
 Queer:Hermann J. Huber ist tot
 romeoliebtjulian.com: Hermann J. Huber died – Persönlicher Nachruf von Peter Panzer

German male journalists
German non-fiction writers
German gay writers
1954 births
2009 deaths
20th-century German journalists
20th-century German LGBT people